Must We Get Divorced? may refer to:

 Must We Get Divorced? (1933 film), a German comedy film
 Must We Get Divorced? (1953 film), a West German comedy film